Multivariate testing is multivariate hypothesis testing. It may also refer to:

 Multivariate statistics
 Multivariate testing in marketing
 A/B testing